

"A" roads

"B" roads
Note: Many of these roads in rural areas do not lead to or from anywhere remotely notable, while many of the roads within towns and villages are very short indeed. This makes it problematic to include "to" or "from" destinations.

See also
 Transport in the Isle of Man
 List of named corners of the Snaefell Mountain Course
 Speed limits in the Isle of Man

References

External links

 Department of Transport Highways Division
 Department of Transport Public Notices relating to roads

Isle Of Man
 
Roads